Leucospis dorsigera is a species of wasp belonging to the family Leucospidae.

Distribution and habitat
This widely distributed species occurs from Eastern Russia through Europe (Austria, Croatia, Czech Republic, France, Germany, Hungary, Italy, Republic of Moldova, North Macedonia, Poland, Romania, Slovakia, Slovenia, Spain, Switzerland) to Near East and North Africa. Leucospis dorsigera  inhabits meadows and wet meadows and other areas where their hosts are abundant.

Description
This rather variable vespid-like specie mimics a stinging wasp. Body is quite robust, with yellow stripes on a black ground color. The fore wings are folded longitudinally. The hind femora are swollen and toothed along the lower margin, with a large median and short lateral teeth. The female shows a relatively short gaster and the ovipositor is turned up, lies along the dorsal side of the metasoma and just reaches to the base of the gaster. In the males the fusion of many of the metasomal segments to form a capsule-like "carapace".

Biology
Adults can be found from May to July. They mainly feed on nectar and pollen of Angelica sylvestris, Heracleum sphondylium and Scorzoneroides autumnalis.

This species is an ectoparasitoid of aculeate wasps or bees. Females penetrate with the long ovipositor  into the bark of trees where they have located the larvae of these insects. Then they lay the eggs in the body of these larvae, that will be eaten by the newly-born wasps.

Females especially parasitize larvae belonging to the family Megachilidae, genera Anthidiellum, Anthidium, Hoplitis and Osmia. Larvae of Leucospis dorsigera also feed on larvae of Chelostoma florisomne and other larvae of Apidae (Megachilinae), Ichneumonidae (Xorides corcyrensis, Xoridinae)  and Bostrychidae (Coleoptera).

Bibliography
  Klug, F. (1818) European species of |Leucospis|., JOURBOOK: Isis, Jena Vol.: 2(9) Pg: 1475
 Boucek, Z. (1974) A revision of the Leucospidae (Hymenoptera: Chalcidoidea) of the world., JOURBOOK: Bulletin of the British Museum (Natural History) Entomology Vol.: Supplement 23 Pg: 241pp
 Dalla Torre, K.W. von (1898) Catalogus Hymenopterorum hucusque descriptorum systematicus et synonymicus. V. Chalcididae et, Pg: 598pp
 Walker, F. (1862) Characters of undescribed species of the genus |Leucospis|., JOURBOOK: Journal of Entomology Vol.: 1 Pg: 16-23
 Westwood, J.O. (1834) On |Leucospis|, a genus of hymenopterous insects., JOURBOOK: Entomological Magazine VOLUME: 2(2) PAGES: 212-218

References

External links
 
 
 Luciana Bartolini
 Biolib
 Bembix

Chalcidoidea
Insects described in 1775
Taxa named by Johan Christian Fabricius